There have been 49 vice presidents of the United States since the office came into existence in 1789. Originally, the vice president was the person who received the second most votes for president in the Electoral College. However, in the election of 1800 a tie in the electoral college between Thomas Jefferson and Aaron Burr led to the selection of the president by the House of Representatives. To prevent such an event from happening again, the Twelfth Amendment was added to the Constitution in 1804, creating the current system where electors cast a separate ballot for the vice presidency.

The vice president is the first person in the presidential line of succession and assumes the presidency if the president dies, resigns, or is impeached and removed from office. Nine vice presidents have ascended to the presidency in this way – eight (John Tyler, Millard Fillmore, Andrew Johnson, Chester A. Arthur, Theodore Roosevelt, Calvin Coolidge, Harry S. Truman, and Lyndon B. Johnson) through the president's death and one (Gerald Ford) through the president's resignation. In addition, the vice president serves as the president of the Senate and may choose to cast a tie-breaking vote on decisions made by the Senate. Vice presidents have exercised this latter power to varying extents over the years.

Prior to adoption of the Twenty-fifth Amendment in 1967, an intra-term vacancy in the office of the vice president could not be filled until the next post-election inauguration. Several such vacancies occurred—seven vice presidents died, one resigned and eight succeeded to the presidency. This amendment allowed for a vacancy to be filled through appointment by the president and confirmation by both chambers of the Congress. Since its ratification, the vice presidency has been vacant twice (both in the context of scandals surrounding the Nixon administration) and was filled both times through this process, namely in 1973 following Spiro Agnew's resignation, and again in 1974 after Gerald Ford succeeded to the presidency. The amendment also established a procedure whereby a vice president may, if the president is unable to discharge the powers and duties of the office, temporarily assume the powers and duties of the office as acting president. Three vice presidents have briefly acted as president under the 25th Amendment: George H. W. Bush on July 13, 1985; Dick Cheney on June 29, 2002 and on July 21, 2007; and Kamala Harris on November 19, 2021.

The persons who have served as vice president were born in or primarily affiliated with 27 states plus the District of Columbia. New York has produced the most of any state as eight have been born there and three others considered it their home state. Most vice presidents have been in their 50s or 60s and had political experience prior to assuming the office. Two vice presidents—George Clinton and John C. Calhoun—served under more than one president. Ill with tuberculosis and recovering in Cuba on Inauguration Day in 1853, William King, by an Act of Congress, was allowed to take the oath outside the United States. He is the only vice president to take his oath of office in a foreign country.

Vice presidents

See also 

 Acting President of the United States
 Founding Fathers of the United States
 List of presidents of the United States
 Presiding Officer of the United States Senate
 United States Senate Vice Presidential Bust Collection

Notes

References

External links 

 Vice presidents of the United States. CNN. July 22, 2016. Retrieved November 21, 2018.
 Mark O. Hatfield, et al.; edited by Wendy Wolff (1997). Vice Presidents of the United States 1789–1993. U.S. Senate Historical Office. U.S. Government Printing Office. Washington.

United States

Lists of legislative speakers in the United States
United States